{{Infobox film festival
| name     = 63rd Berlin Film Festival
| image    = 63BIFFPoster.jpg
| caption  = Festival poster
| host     = Anke Engelke
| number   = 404 films
| opening  = The Grandmaster
| closing  = Child's Pose'
| location = Berlin, Germany
| awards   = Golden Bear (Child's Pose)
| date     = 7–17 February 2013
| founded  = 1951
| website  = Website
| chronology     = Berlin International Film Festival
| preceded_by    = 62nd
| followed_by    = 64th
}}

The 63rd annual Berlin International Film Festival took place in Berlin, Germany between 7 and 17 February 2013. Chinese film director Wong Kar-wai was announced as the President of the Jury and his film The Grandmaster was the opening film of the festival. The Golden Bear was awarded to the Romanian film Child's Pose directed by Călin Peter Netzer, which also served as the closing film.

The French documentary filmmaker Claude Lanzmann was awarded with the Honorary Golden Bear. Italian actress Isabella Rossellini and German film director Rosa von Praunheim were awarded with the Berlinale Camera.

Competition

Jury
The following people were on the jury for the festival:

International jury
 Wong Kar-wai,  director, screenwriter and producer (China) - President of the jury
 Susanne Bier, director and screenwriter (Denmark)
 Andreas Dresen, director and screenwriter (Germany)
 Ellen Kuras, director and director of photography (United States)
 Shirin Neshat, visual artist and film director (Iran)
 Tim Robbins, actor, director, screenwriter and producer (United States)
 Athina Rachel Tsangari, director, screenwriter and producer (Greece)

Best First Feature Award Jury
 Oren Moverman, director, screenwriter and producer (Israel)
 Taika Waititi, actor, director and screenwriter (New Zealand)
 Lucy Walker, director (United Kingdom)

International Short Film Jury
 Javier Fesser, director and screenwriter (Spain)
 Hyung-sook Hong, director and screenwriter (South Korea)
 Susanne Pfeffer, art historian and curator (Germany)

In competition
The following films were selected for the main competition for the Golden Bear and Silver Bear awards:

Out of competition
The following films were selected to be screened out of competition:

Panorama
The following films were selected for the Panorama section:

Forum
The following films were selected for the Forum section:

Key
{| class="wikitable" width="550" colspan="1"
| style="background:#FFDEAD;" align="center"| †
|Winner of the main award for best film in its section
|-
| colspan="2"| The opening and closing films are screened during the opening and closing ceremonies respectively.
|}

Awards

The following prizes were awarded:
 Golden Bear: Child's Pose by Călin Peter Netzer
 Jury Grand Prix (Silver Bear): An Episode in the Life of an Iron Picker by Danis Tanović
 Alfred Bauer Prize (Silver Bear): Vic and Flo Saw a Bear by Denis Côté
 Silver Bear for Best Director: David Gordon Green for Prince Avalanche Silver Bear for Best Actress: Paulina García for Gloria Silver Bear for Best Actor: Nazif Mujić for An Episode in the Life of an Iron Picker Silver Bear for Best Script: Jafar Panahi for Closed Curtain Award for an outstanding artistic contribution: Aziz Zhambakiyev for Harmony Lessons Special Mentions:
 Promised Land by Gus Van Sant
 Layla Fourie by Pia Marais
 Panorama:
 Ecumenical Jury Prize: The Act of Killing by Joshua Oppenheimer
 Panorama Audience Award: The Act of Killing by Joshua Oppenheimer
 Forum:
 Ecumenical Jury Prize: Circles by Srdan Golubović
 FIPRESCI Jury Prize: Hélio Oiticica by Cesar Oiticica Filho
 NETPAC Award Best Asian Film: When I Saw You by Annemarie Jacir
 C.I.C.A.E. Jury Prize: In Bloom'' by Nana Ekvtimishvili, Simon Groß

References

External links

 Yearbook 2013 at berlinale.de
 63rd Berlin International Film Festival 2013

Berlin International Film Festival
Berlin Film Festival
Berlin Film Festival
2013 in Berlin
Berl